The women's marathon at the 2008 Summer Olympics took place on August 17 around an urban circuit specifically designed for the competition at Beijing, and finished in the Beijing National Stadium; it was, as of today, the last time in Summer Olympics history in which women's marathon route start and/or finish was located in the Olympic Stadium. The qualifying standards were 2:37.00 (A standard) and 2:42.00 (B standard). There were a total number of 82 competitors from 42 nations.

The winner was Constantina Diṭă-Tomescu of Romania who at one point took a lead of over a minute and maintained it ahead of the chasing pack all the way into the stadium. She completed the marathon in a time of 2:26:44. In second place was Catherine Ndereba of Kenya who completed the race in 2:27:06, closely followed by bronze medalist Zhou Chunxiu of China who finished in a time of 2:27:07.

World record holder Paula Radcliffe of Great Britain took part in the race despite injury problems that bothered her throughout the previous year. However, she did not feature for much of the race and had to pause and do some exercises to rid herself of cramps at one point. She then proceeded to finish the marathon in 23rd place in a time of 2:32:38.

Records
Prior to this event, the existing world and Olympic records were as follows:

Schedule
All times are China standard time (UTC+8)

Results

References

External links
Official list of participants, and their results
sports-reference

Athletics at the 2008 Summer Olympics
Marathons at the Olympics
Summer Olympics
2008 Summer Olympics
Summer Olympics marathon
Women's events at the 2008 Summer Olympics
2008